Edward Joseph Onslow (February 17, 1893 – May 8, 1981) was a first baseman in American Major League Baseball who played for the Detroit Tigers (1912–13), Cleveland Indians (1918) and Washington Senators (1927). Born in Meadville, Pennsylvania, he was the younger brother of Jack Onslow, a catcher, coach and scout in the major leagues, and the manager of the 1949–50 Chicago White Sox.  

His playing career in professional baseball lasted for two decades (1911–29; 1931), and included seven consecutive outstanding seasons (1918–24) for the Toronto Maple Leafs of the International League, during which Onslow hit over .300 each year and made his managerial debut as playing skipper of the 1922 Leafs. He led the team to a 76–88 record. 
Like his elder brother, Onslow also was a longtime minor league manager. He also scouted for the White Sox and Philadelphia Athletics.

In parts of four major league seasons he played in 64 games, with 207 at bats, 19 runs scored, 48 hits, three doubles, two triples, one home run, 22 runs batted in, four stolen bases, nine bases on balls, a  .232 batting average, .271 on-base percentage, .280 slugging percentage, 58 total bases and four sacrifice hits.

He was elected to the International League Hall of Fame in 1951 and died in Dennison, Ohio, thirty years later at the age of 88.

External links

1893 births
1981 deaths
Baltimore Orioles (IL) players
Baseball players from Pennsylvania
Chicago White Sox scouts
Cleveland Indians players
Detroit Tigers players
Harrisburg Senators players
Indianapolis Indians players
Lansing Senators players
Major League Baseball first basemen
Minor league baseball managers
Newark Bears (IL) players
People from Meadville, Pennsylvania
Philadelphia Athletics scouts
Providence Grays (minor league) players
Rochester Tribe players
Toronto Maple Leafs (International League) managers
Toronto Maple Leafs (International League) players
Washington Senators (1901–1960) players